Ahmad Khairuddin Haj Mohamad (born 31 January 1987), commonly known as Ahmad Haj Mohamad, is a Syrian footballer who plays for Hutteen SC in Syrian Premier League.

Club career

Syria
Ahmad began his professional career with his parent club Hutteen in 2006. In October 2009, he moved to Syrian Premier League club Al-Ittihad Aleppo and helped them win the 2010 AFC Cup, Asia's second biggest club football tournament and also the 2010–11 Syrian Cup.

Jordan
In July 2012, he moved to Jordan and on 10 July 2014 he signed a one-year contract with Shabab Al-Ordon Club.

Iraq
In 2013, he moved to Iraq and on 11 February 2013 he signed a six-month contract with Al-Sinaa.

Lebanon
In August 2013, he moved to Lebanon and signed a one-year contract with Salam Zgharta.

Oman
In August 2014, he moved to Oman and on 27 August 2014 he signed a one-year contract with Al-Seeb Club of Oman Professional League.

Back to Syria
After a two-year spell outside Syria, he returned to Syria in 2015 and on 1 February 2015, he signed a six-month contract with his parent club, Hutteen SC.

International career
He has been a regular for the Syria national football team since 2009. Senior national coach Fajr Ibrahim called him for the first time, and he debuted in a 5 June 2009 friendly against Sierra Leone. He came on as a substitute for Adel Abdullah in the second halftime.

Honour and Titles

Club
Al-Ittihad
 Syrian Cup: 2011
 AFC Cup: 2010

References

External links

Ahmad Haj Mohamad at Goal.com

Ahmad Haj Mohamad - GOALZZ.com
Ahmad Haj Mohamad - KOOORA

1987 births
Living people
People from Latakia
Syrian footballers
Syria international footballers
Syrian expatriate footballers
Association football midfielders
Hutteen Latakia players
Al-Ittihad Aleppo players
Shabab Al-Ordon Club players
Al-Seeb Club players
Oman Professional League players
Expatriate footballers in Jordan
Syrian expatriate sportspeople in Jordan
Expatriate footballers in Iraq
Syrian expatriate sportspeople in Iraq
Expatriate footballers in Lebanon
Syrian expatriate sportspeople in Lebanon
Expatriate footballers in Oman
Syrian expatriate sportspeople in Oman
AFC Cup winning players
Salam Zgharta FC players
Lebanese Premier League players
Syrian Premier League players